The Liga Mayor de Baloncesto (LMB) is a men's professional basketball league in Americas, currently composed of 9 teams. It is the premier professional men's basketball league in El Salvador.
It is the top level of the El Salvador basketball league system. The league is controlled by the El Salvador Basketball Federation (in Spanish: Federación Salvadoreña de Baloncesto.).

History 

The league was formed in 2017, following the end of the previous iteration of the first division Liga Superior de Baloncesto de El Salvador.

Current clubs 
The Liga Mayor de Baloncesto (LMB) was founded in 2017 with nine teams. Due to club expansions, reductions and relocations, many of the teams either changed or ceased to exist. There are currently eleven teams. The teams are located in TBD, TBD, TBD, TBD, TBD, TBD, TBD, and TBD. The TBD are the oldest club in the competition, having participated in every season since 2017.

 Santa Tecla BC
 Aguila BC
 Brujos de Izalco BC
 AD Isidro Metapan BC
 Quezaltepeque BC
 San Salvador BC
 Santiagueno BC
 Club Municipal de Baloncesto de Cojutepeque
 Chalchuapa United
 Santa Ana B.C.
 Nejapa B.C

Future expansion

Former clubs 
 Fantasmas de San Vicente (2021)
 FAS-Denver (-2017)
 El Rápido La Unión (-2017)
 Halcones de Sonzacate (-2020)
 Once Lobos (-2019)
 Giants de San Salvador (-2018)
 Canarios de Once Municipal (-2017)
 San Miguel BC (2017)
 Arcense Biomedical BC (2017)
 Tigres Voladores STGO de Maria

Honours

List of champions

List of coaches 
   José Luis Dámaso Martinez (A.D. Isidro Metapan, Quezaltepeque Basketball Club)
  Ricardo Renderos - Halcones
  Roberto Carrillo - Santa Tecla BC
  William Avalos - Santa Tecla BC 
  Adrián Paumier - Santa Tecla BC
 Joaquin Meralega - Aguila
 Ismael Ochoa - Aguila
 Cristopher Blade - Aguila
Shannel Brackett - Cojuetepeque
Orestes Quiroz - Once Lobos
Patrick Davis - FASDenver

List of Players 
  Jose Colorado - AD Isidro Metapan BC
  Jose Arajuo - Brujos de Izalco
  Michael Hinestroza - Brujos de Izalco
  Cristian  Arboleda - AD Isidro Metapan BC
  Michael Jackson - San Salvador BC
  Alejandro Alvarez - AD Isidro Metapan BC
  Osmel Oliva - Brujos de Izalco
  Mario Cairo - Quezaleque BC
  Yoel Cubillas - San Salvador BC
  Oreste Torres - Quezaleque BC
  Yunistel Molina - San Salvador BC
  Pasval Medrano - Halcones
  Leadro Cabrera  - Santa Tecla BC
  Barthel Lopez - AD Isidro Metapan BC
  Ron Patten Jnr - Brujos de Izalco
  Jose Ortiz - Chalchuapa Utd
  Marcus Feige - Chalchuapa Utd
  Dennis Miles - Chalchuapa Utd
  Jacarre Crockett - Quezaleque BC
  Mark Montavious - Santa Ana BC
  David Hage - Santa Ana BC
  Jaston Nixon - Santa Ana BC
  Timonthy Jackson - Halcones
  Joey Luis Baez - Halcones
  Quincy Scates - CBM Cojutepeque
  Shahmel  Brackett - CBM Cojutepeque
  Marcus Faison - Santa Tecla BC
  Roberto Martinez - San Salvador BC
  William Kenneth - Aguila BC
  Malam Macam - Aguila BC
  Eddie Isthmin - Once Lobos BC
  Lee Vasquez - Aguila BC

External links
 https://www.tigosports.com.sv/liga-clubes/liga-mayor-de-baloncesto
 https://www.elsalvador.com/deportes/otros-deportes/coronavirus-baloncesto-extranjeros-esperan-vuelos-para-regresar-a-casa/712165/2020/

Basketball in El Salvador
Sports leagues in El Salvador
El
Sports leagues established in 1985
2016 establishments in El Salvador